Brooke Barbuto (born April 24, 1987, in Syracuse, New York) is an American soccer player who currently plays for NiceFutis in the Finnish women's premier division Naisten Liiga. She has previously played for Buffalo Flash and Rochester Ravens in the W-League, the Icelandic team Haukar and for GBK Kokkola in Finland.

References 

1987 births
Sportspeople from Syracuse, New York
Stony Brook University alumni
USL W-League (1995–2015) players
Expatriate women's footballers in Iceland
Expatriate women's footballers in Finland
American women's soccer players
Living people
NiceFutis players
Women's association football midfielders
Stony Brook Seawolves women's soccer players